Tim Sweeney is an American radio host, DJ, and producer, known for his long-running show on WNYU-FM, Beats in Space. Sweeney also runs independent label under the Beats in Space moniker.

Career 
Sweeney’s show, Beats in Space, first aired on WNYU in the Fall of 1999, while Sweeney was a freshman at NYU. The show gained traction after he hosted many high-profile DJs and producers in the early 2000s, including James Murphy, DJ Harvey, Carl Craig, Diplo, The Avalanches, and Hot Chip, among others.

Since 2003, Sweeney has also been heavily involved with many DFA releases and fellow Brooklyn-based label RVNG.

Beats in Space (Radio Show) 
Beats in Space was a radio show mixed live by Tim Sweeney and guests, and it aired every Tuesday night from 10:30pm to 1:00am on WNYU-FM. On 9 March 2021, Sweeney announced on-air that the show would be his last on WNYU after 21 years, and that he would be taking a break from broadcasting.

Beats in Space Records 
In 2011, Sweeney launched his own label, Beats in Space, with the release of the single “Parfait Tirage b/w La Ballade de Jim” by French duo, Paradis. The label has had a steady output of releases, the most recent one being “Dawning Light” by Jacques Bon (2017). Other critically acclaimed releases include Jee Day’s “Sum of Love”, Tornado Wallace’s “Desperate Pleasures” and Secret Circuit’s “Tactile Galactics”. Sweeney also released a thirty-track CD compilation in 2014, “Beats in Space 15th Anniversary.”

Other Credits 
Sweeney worked as soundtrack supervisor at Rockstar Games from 2003 to 2006 for games including GTA: San Andreas, GTA: Liberty City Stories, The Warriors, and Midnight Club 3.

References

External links 
 http://www.allmusic.com/artist/tim-sweeney-mn0001467933
 https://www.residentadvisor.net/dj-home.aspx?name=timsweeney&sub=biography
 https://www.xlr8r.com/features/2014/11/beats-in-space-an-oral-history/
 http://www.nbcnewyork.com/blogs/niteside/Tim-Sweeney-Interview--81318467.html
 https://thump.vice.com/en_us/article/15-years-on-tim-sweeney-looks-back-at-beats-in-space
 http://www.dummymag.com/lists/15-years-of-beats-in-space-playlist-by-tim-sweeney
 http://www.rbmaradio.com/shows/tim-sweeney-live-at-12-years-of-dfa-records

American radio DJs